Warshow Angels are an American rock band from New York City formed in 2013 by singer-guitarist Kneel Cohn. The band combines elements of post-punk, gothic rock and glam rock genres and has been compared to and influenced by The Lords of the New Church, Love and Rockets and Sigue Sigue Sputnik.

Biography
Warshow Angels was formed by singer-guitarist Kneel Cohn in 2013 after the dissolution of The Dead Stars On Hollywood with drummer Todd Bryerton, formerly of electro-industrial activist group Consolidated.

The band's self-titled debut album is known for its many guest appearances by musicians from established post-punk, glam rock, psych-rock and electro/industrial bands. Notable credited artists include guitarist Peter Holmström of  The Dandy Warhols and Pete International Airport, bassist Sami Yaffa of Hanoi Rocks, Michael Monroe's bands and New York Dolls, Tony Barber, former bassist of Buzzcocks, guitarist Nicky Garratt from U.K. Subs and Nik Turner's Hawkwind, Martin Shellard, former bassist of Spiritualized and Julian Beeston from Nitzer Ebb.

The songs Love Hz and Bang Bang Love appear on Home On The Range, a farm animal benefit album presented by CFEI, a 501c3 non-profit animal rights organization. The album includes original songs by Moby, Joan Jett, The Pretenders, Yoko Ono, Bright Eyes, Nellie McKay, and Howard Jones.

Discography

Studio albums
 Warshow Angels (2014)

Compilation albums
 Home On The Range (2016)

References

Other sources
C, Laurent (music editor). Warshow Angels S/T. Veglam, July, 2014.
Ellis-Ritter, Karen (director) "Home On The Range Benefit" CFEI, March, 2016

External links
Official Warshow Angels website
Official Home On The Range Benefit website
Official CFEI website
Discogs website

Musical groups established in 2013
Musical groups from New York City
Rock music groups from New York (state)
2013 establishments in New York City